Methaphenilene is an antihistamine and anticholinergic.

Synthesis
Methaphenilene can be synthesized from N,N-dimethyl-N′-phenylethane-1,2-diamine by alkylation with 2-(chloromethyl)thiophene.

See also 
Thenalidine
Methapyrilene

References 

Sedatives
Thiophenes
Diamines
H1 receptor antagonists